The small frog (Ranoidea manya) is a species of frog in the subfamily Pelodryadinae. It is endemic to Australia, where its natural habitats are subtropical or tropical dry lowland grassland and intermittent freshwater marshes.

References

Ranoidea (genus)
Amphibians of Queensland
Amphibians described in 1980
Taxonomy articles created by Polbot
Frogs of Australia
Taxobox binomials not recognized by IUCN